Deptuła or Deptula is a surname. Notable people with the surname include:

 David Deptula, American Lieutenant General 
 Leszek Deptuła (1953–2010), Polish veterinarian
 Zbigniew Deptuła (born 1962), Polish politician 
 Walter Deptula (born, 1934, American; Engineer, Author, Naval Aviator, Executive, Municipal Manager, Artist (Painter-Sculptor), Artist (Theatrical), Theatrical (Producer-Manager), Impresario, Educator.